The Leninist Communist Youth Union of the Russian Federation (LYCL RF; , ЛКСМ РФ; Leninskij kommunističeskij sojuz molodjoži Rossijskoj Federacii, LKSM RF), usually known as the Leninist Komsomol of the Russian Federation (komsomol being a Russian syllabic abbreviation for Young Communist League), is the youth organization of the Communist Party of the Russian Federation.

Up until February 2011 it was known as the Union of Communist Youth of the Russian Federation (СКМ РФ; Sojuz kommunističeskoj molodjoži Rossijskoj Federacii, SKM RF).

History 
The Leninist Young Communist League traces its origins to the founding of the Soviet Komsomol in 1918. After the dissolution of the Soviet Union in 1991, the Komsomol, having already lost much of its original identity, was disorganized and de facto dissolved. Many socialist and communist youth organizations would emerge from its ruins, many of which would come together to form the Union of Communist Youth in 1999.

In 2004, there was an internal conflict within the ranks of the Union of Communist Youth, resulting in a split of two factions, one headed by Yuri Afonin, and the other by Konstantin Zhukov. Afonin's faction represented the overwhelming majority of the organization members and remained tied to the KPRF, while Zhukov's faction became independent and gradually deteriorated into organization without any members, but with the leadership. Both factions kept the same name until February 2011 when the faction headed by Afonin changed name to the Leninist Communist Youth Union of the Russian Federation.

The Leninist Communist Youth Union was a main organization that took part in efforts to organize the 19th World Festival of Youth and Students which took place in October 2017 in Sochi.

Strategic goals 
In the economic sphere LKSM stands for a balanced planned and market economy - an important step in building socialism, in which the state has a determining role.
In the social sphere the organization supports the implementation of national programs aimed at creating a full-fledged social security system, for solving the problems of youth in the area of employment, education, family, and physical and spiritual health.
LKSM insists on the transition, from currently purely propaganda actions, to real practical steps to create a full-fledged union state with Belarus, as well as the reintegration of former Soviet republics, all-round cooperation with which the most important for the Russian Federation - Ukraine and Kazakhstan.
LKSM considers it is necessary for drastic measures to eliminate youth crime by addressing its generating socio-economic reasons. At the same time they oppose the horrible conditions in which the accused and convicts serve, most of whom are young people. Punishment shall correct, rather than maim people.

Activities 
To reach the objectives of the organization, LKSM leads a variety of activities, such as: 
Organizing meetings, rallies, demonstrations, picketing with the purpose of expressing an opinion on current societal and youth issues. Participating in election campaigns for the Communist Party, put forward, in collaboration with the Communist Party, its representatives in government bodies at various levels. Developing a network of regional, local and primary LKSM offices. Organizing at the universities: courses, clubs, libraries, studios, summer camps etc.

References

1999 establishments in Russia
Communist Party of the Russian Federation
Youth organizations established in the 1990s
Youth wings of communist parties
Youth wings of political parties in Russia